Maksud Ibnugadzharovich Sadikov (16 March 1963 – 7 June 2011) was a professor in international relations and Islamic economics, a practicing Sufi, follower of Shaykh Said Afandi al-Chirkawi.

Biography 

He was born in the village of Archib, Charodinsky District, republic of Dagestan. Islamic scholar, Muslim intellectual, Rector of Institute of Theology and International Relations, Makhachkala, Dagestan. 
He was assassinated in Makhachkala, and buried in Archib, Dagestan. On 5 July 2011 Russia's President Dmitry Medvedev posthumously awarded Maksud Sadikov with Order of Courage in a meeting with North Caucasus Muftis and religious leaders in Vladikavkaz. In a gathering held in memory of Maksud Sadikov in Makhachkala, it was decided to organize 6 October as annual Maksud Sadikov commemoration day.

Education 
1981–1986: Moscow Temiryazev Agricultural Academy (MTAA).
1987–1990: Master of Economics and Management, MTAA. 
1994–1996: PhD in government administration from Moscow State Lomonosov University.
1998–2000: Public Administration Academy of Russian Federation.
2003–2004: Open Ecological University of MSU.

Work experience 
1986–1987: Researcher, Moscow Temiryazev Agricultural Academy.
1991–1997: Senior Researcher, School of Public Administration, MTAA. 
1997–1999: Director, Ministry of National Policy of Russian Federation. 
1999–2000: Adviser, Ministry of Nationalities and Federation Affairs of RF. 
2000–2002: Adviser, Ministry of Federation Affairs, National and Migrational Policies, RF. 
2001–2003: President, MamaDibir Rochi Theological Humanitarian Academy
2003–2011: Rector, Institute of Theology and International Relations, Makhachkala.

Publications

References

External links 
 Theology professor shot in Russia's Dagestan
 Academic's murder hampers Dagestan peace efforts
 Institute of Theology and International Relations

1963 births
2011 deaths
People from Charodinsky District
Avar people
Russian Sufis
Sunni Sufis
20th-century Islamic religious leaders
Russian religious leaders
Recipients of the Order of Courage
Assassinated religious leaders
Deaths by firearm in Russia
People murdered in Russia
Russian murder victims
Assassinated Dagestanian people